Dinoptera is a genus of the Lepturinae subfamily in long-horned beetle family.

Species
Species within this genus include:
 Dinoptera anthracina (Mannerheim, 1849)
 Dinoptera chrysomelina Holzschuh, 2003
 Dinoptera collaris (Linnaeus, 1758)
 Dinoptera concolor Ganglbauer, 1888
 Dinoptera daghestanica (Pic, 1897)
 Dinoptera lota Holzschuh, 1998
 Dinoptera minuta (Gebler, 1832)

References

Lepturinae